The 1997–98 First League of FR Yugoslavia was the sixth season of the FR Yugoslavia's top-level football league since its establishment.

Overview 
The league was divided into 2 groups, A and B, consisting each of 10 clubs. Both groups were played in league system. By winter break all clubs in each group meet each other twice, home and away, with the bottom four classified from A group moving to the group B, and being replaced by the top four from the B group. At the end of the season because the two groups league format was being abandoned for the next season and replaced by a single league consisting of 16 clubs, more clubs were relegated, six, and only the two first classified from the Second League of FR Yugoslavia would be promoted.

At the end of the season FK Obilić became champions for the first time in their history.

The league's top-scorer with a total of 27 goals was Saša Marković who played the first half of the season with FK Železnik and moving during the winter break to Red Star Belgrade where he played the rest of the season.

Six clubs were relegated at the end of the season: FK Budućnost Valjevo, FK Rudar Pljevlja, FK Sutjeska Nikšić, FK Loznica, FK Borac Čačak and FK Bečej.

Teams

1A League

1B League

IA league

Table

Results

First and second round

Third round

IB league

Table

Results

First and second round

Third round

Relegation playoff

Winning squad
Champions: FK Obilić (Coach: Dragan Okuka)

Players (league matches/goals)
 Milan Lešnjak
 Miroslav Savić (32/1)
 Nenad Lukić (32/0)
 Saša Kovačević (30/7)
 Zoran Ranković (29/23)
 Nenad Grozdić (29/4)
 Kuzman Babeu (29/4)
 Dragan Šarac (29/3)
 Marjan Živković (28/7)
 Živojin Juškić (28/4)
 Darko Nović (27/1)
 Ivan Vukomanović (24/3)
 Saša Viciknez (16/3)
 Sahmir Garčević (16/1)
 Darko Vargec (14/0)
 Goran Serafimović (8/0)
 Siniša Jelić (7/3)
 Veselin Popović (7/3)
 Ivan Litera (7/2)
 Predrag Filipović (7/0)
 Miroslav Milošević (7/0)
 Vladan Milosavljević (5/0)
 Duško Košutić (2/0)
 Zoran Ivić (2/0)
 Mirko Babić (1/1)
 Radovan Gajić (1/0)
 Slaviša Mitić (1/0)

Top goalscorers

External sources 
 Obilic team in Tripod.com

External links 
 Tables and results at RSSSF

Yugoslav First League seasons
Yugo
1997–98 in Yugoslav football